The 2022 European Juniors Wrestling Championships was held in Rome, Italy between 27 June to 3 July 2022.

Competition schedule
All times are (UTC+2)

Medal table

Team ranking

Medal overview

Men's freestyle

Men's Greco-Roman

Women's freestyle

Participating nations 
467 wrestlers from 35 countries:

  (3)
  (20)
  (5)
  (25)
  (4)
  (27)
  (4)
  (8)
  (9)
  (7)
  (9)
  (15)
  (1)
  (21)
  (24)
  (15)
  (28)
  (10)
  (27)
  (2)
  (8)
  (13)
  (21)
  (4)
  (1)
  (7)
  (27)
  (2)
  (21)
  (11)
  (6)
  (7)
  (13)
  (30)
  (30)

Russia and Belarus banned from attending all international wrestling competitions due to the 2022 Russian invasion of Ukraine.

References

External links 
 Database